The South-East Metropolitan Province was a two-member electoral province of the Western Australian Legislative Council, located in metropolitan Perth. It was one of several metropolitan seats created following the enactment of the Constitution Acts Amendment Act (No.2) 1963, and became effective on 22 May 1965. The province, with its mix of safe Labor and Liberal Assembly seats, also produced mixed fortunes for both parties until 1983, when a redistribution turned it into a safe Labor seat and the two sitting Liberal members successfully transferred to the new South Central Metropolitan Province seat.

In 1989, the province was abolished by the Acts Amendment (Electoral Reform) Act 1987, and was split between the East Metropolitan and South Metropolitan five-member regions under the new proportional voting system.

Geography
The province was made up of several complete Legislative Assembly districts, which changed at each distribution.

Representation

Members

 Transferred to South Central Metropolitan Province at the 1983 election.

References
 

Former electoral provinces of Western Australia